Romain Arneodo and Tristan-Samuel Weissborn were the defending champions but only Weissborn chose to defend his title, partnering Sander Arends. Weissborn lost in the first round to Jürgen Melzer and Filip Polášek.

Zdeněk Kolář and Adam Pavlásek won the title after defeating Melzer and Polášek 6–3, 6–4 in the final.

Seeds

Draw

References
 Main draw

Koblenz Open - Doubles
2019 Doubles